Sonny Stitt Sits in with the Oscar Peterson Trio is a 1959 album by Sonny Stitt, accompanied by the Oscar Peterson trio.

Reception
The Penguin Guide to Jazz rated the album three and a half stars out of four and wrote of the session, "they intermingle their respective many-noted approaches as plausibly  as if this were a regular band (in fact, they never recorded together again)."  The Allmusic review written by Scott Yanow rated the album four and a half stars out of five.

Track listing
 "I Can't Give You Anything But Love" (Dorothy Fields, Jimmy McHugh) – 4:05
 "Au Privave" (Charlie Parker) – 3:59
 "The Gypsy" (Billy Reid) – 3:25
 "I'll Remember April" (Gene de Paul, Patricia Johnston, Don Raye) – 4:41
 "Scrapple from the Apple" (Parker) – 4:20
 "Moten Swing" (Bennie Moten) – 7:09
 "Blues for Pres, Sweets, Ben and All the Other Funky Ones" (Sonny Stitt) – 6:04
 "Easy Does It" (Sy Oliver, Trummy Young) – 5:21

Personnel

Performance
 Sonny Stitt - alto saxophone (tracks 1-5), tenor saxophone (tracks 6-8)
Oscar Peterson Trio
 Oscar Peterson – piano
 Ray Brown – double bass
 Ed Thigpen - drums

References

1959 albums
Sonny Stitt albums
Oscar Peterson albums
Albums produced by Norman Granz
Verve Records albums